Governor Wentworth may refer to:

Sir John Wentworth, 1st Baronet (1737–1820), Governor of the Province of New Hampshire from 1767 to 1775
Benning Wentworth (1696–1770), Governor of the Province of New Hampshire from 1741 to 1766